Robert Naylor (born July 6, 1996) is a Canadian actor and musician known for his voice-over on the Canadian/American television series Arthur as Dora Winifred "D.W." Read from 2007 to 2012, as well as lead roles in 10 1/2 (2010), 1.54 (2016) and Ghost Town Anthology (2019).

Early life
Naylor was born in Pointe-Claire, Quebec, Canada and is fluent in English and French.

Acting career
Naylor started acting in 2003 when he joined the local children's theatre school Theatre West (formerly Pegasus Performing Arts). He first appeared on TV in an English commercial, a part he got from his first audition. He has had various television movie roles including Adam in Race to Mars, Jamie in Voices, and Young Tanner in Fakers. His first lead role came at the age of 12 in the Quebec feature 10½ starring Claude Legault and directed by Daniel Grou. His role of Tommy in 10½ earned him the Best Actor award at the International Film Festival Bratislava in 2010, a nomination in the 31st Genie Awards for Performance by an Actor in a Leading Role, and a Young Artist Award for Best Performance in an International Feature Film.

In 2010, he worked on U.S.-produced movie Immortals, directed by Tarsem Singh, playing Young Theseus. His first recurring role in a TV series is that of Theo in the Radio-Canada Quebec TV series 19-2, which started in early 2011 on Radio-Canada. Directed by Daniel Grou ("Podz"), the series tells the story of two Montreal cops. Robert plays the role of Théo Berof, the son of the character played by Réal Bossé.

In May 2011, he portrayed Eric Hillridge in the Muse Entertainment-produced TV movie Cyberbully, which was shot in Montreal and premiered on ABC Family on July 17, 2011. Later that summer, he received the role of Stevie Atkins, a ghost, in the second season of Being Human. He then worked on one episode of an IFC scripted TV series, Bullet in the Face, which was produced by Muse Entertainment and Just For Laughs and aired in summer 2012.

Music career
Naylor is also a musician and producer who performs under the name Rob Naylor. His first Track "Yes" was released on Gareth Emery's label Garuda in July 2013, followed by another EP later in the year. In 2019 he released another track with Trance DJ & Producer Ben Gold under the name Rb Naylr.

He composed his first film score in 2018.

Filmography

Feature films

Television

Short films

Documentary

Discography

Singles
As Rob Naylor
2013 Yes (Garuda)
2013 Head North / Forever City (Garuda)
As Rb Naylr
2019 Why You EL? (With Ben Gold) (Armada Music)

Remixes
2014 Solis & Sean Truby - Raccoon (Rob Naylor Remix) (Infrasonic Recordings)
2015 Greg Wonders, Arnaud S & Sarah Shields - Out Of This World (Rob Naylor Remix) (Nueva Recordings)

Awards

References

External links
 
 

1996 births
Living people
Anglophone Quebec people
Canadian male child actors
Canadian male film actors
Canadian male television actors
Canadian male voice actors
People from Pointe-Claire
21st-century Canadian male actors
Male actors from Quebec